The North Jersey Transportation Planning Authority (NJTPA) is the federally authorized metropolitan planning organization (MPO) for the 13-county northern New Jersey region, one of three MPOs in the state. NJTPA's annual budget is more than $2 billion for transportation improvement projects. The Authority also participates in inter-agency cooperation and receives public input into funding decisions. The NJTPA sponsors and conducts studies, assists county planning agencies and monitors compliance with national air quality goals. The Authority provides federal funding to support the planning work of its 15 subregions. The funds are matched by a local contribution. As vital partners in regional planning work, the subregions help bring a local perspective to all aspects of NJTPA's work to improve the northern New Jersey transportation network.

When Union County Freeholder Angel Estrada was elected Chair of the NJTPA Board of Trustees on January 22, 2018, he became the first Latino to hold that position.

Formation
NJTPA was created in 1982 after the disbanding of the Tri-State Regional Planning Commission, a metropolitan planning organization for the states of New York, New Jersey, and Connecticut.

Area
The NJTPA region consists of 15 subregions each represented on the NJTPA Board. The states two largest cities, Newark and Jersey City and the 13 counties of Bergen, Essex, Hudson, Hunterdon, Middlesex, Monmouth, Ocean, Morris, Passaic, Somerset, Sussex, Union, and Warren are represented. Together they comprise the Gateway Region, Skylands Region, and northern Jersey Shore.

Regional partners
Along with member agencies the New Jersey Department of Transportation (NJDOT), New Jersey Transit, State of NJ Office of the Governor, and the Port Authority of New York and New Jersey. These regional partners carry out transportation planning work that helps NJTPA identify and address regional-level transportation needs.

Board and Committees

The NJTPA Board of Trustees includes 15 local elected officials, including one representative from each of the 13 member counties as well as from Newark and Jersey City. The Board also includes a Governor's representative, the Commissioner of the NJDOT, the Executive Director of NJ TRANSIT, the Chairman of the Port Authority of New York & New Jersey and a citizen's representative. Board membership is an uncompensated position.

Every two years the Board elects a new Executive Committee, which provides guidance and leadership to the full Board on a wide range of planning, policy and administrative issues. It meets as needed to review financial, personnel and policy matters. Passaic County Commissioner John W. Bartlett was elected Chair of the Board for the 2022-2023 term. The Board elected Ocean County Commissioner John "Jack" Kelly First Vice Chair, Middlesex County Commissioner Charles Kenny Second Vice Chair, and Union County Commissions Bette Jane Kowalski Board Secretary. In accordance with the bylaws, Commissioner Bartlett appointed Warren County Commissioner Jason Sarnoski to the position of Third Vice Chair. Prominent Trustees have included Glenn Langberg of GRL Capital from 2006-2008.

The Board has three standing committees that make recommendations on action items to be considered by the full Board:
Planning & Economic Development Committee
Project Prioritization Committee
Freight Initiatives Committee

In addition, there is a Regional Transportation Advisory Committee composed of planners and engineers from the subregions that meets to review regional issues and act as advisers to the Board.

Long Range Plan
NJTPA planning activities are guided by its long range plan, which is updated every four years. The NJTPA Long Range Transportation Plan analyzes all aspects of transportation in northern and central New Jersey and sets an investment blueprint for the next 25 years. The Board of Trustees adopted the current plan, Plan 2050: Transportation. People. Opportunity., in September 2021. The plan incorporates emphasis areas established by the federal government, state government transportation and land use policy, and local government transportation goals.

The plan considers the many transportation challenges the region faces: severe road congestion and unreliable travel times in many locations; public transit that serves many, but is limited in some areas and reaching capacity in others; a need for more facilities for safe walking and biking; and, perhaps most critically, the vital need for new rail tunnels under the Hudson River.

Plan 2050 focuses on meeting these challenges by preserving and enhancing the region's roads, bridges, rail lines, port facilities and more. It also considers game changers such as self-driving cars, truck platoons, adaptive traffic signals, alternative fuel vehicles and the increase in ride hailing services. The plan also reflects input from citizens throughout North Jersey, who said they want walkable communities, more transit options, more reliable commute times and better access to jobs among other things.

While mobility is a primary concern, Plan 2050 also considers how transportation investments can promote broader regional objectives. To that end, the plan incorporates the four themes and corresponding strategies that emerged from Together North Jersey, an extraordinary region-wide planning consortium launched in 2013, which NJTPA continues to play a leadership role in.

Street Smart NJ

Street Smart NJ is a public education campaign coordinated by the North Jersey Transportation Planning Authority that aims to raise awareness of pedestrian and motorist laws and change the behaviors that lead to pedestrian and cyclist crashes and fatalities. Obeying traffic laws and street signs is vital to everyone's health and safety.

Street Smart NJ emphasizes educating drivers, pedestrians and bicyclists through mass media, as well as targeted enforcement. Since its inception in 2013, more than 200 partner agencies and communities have participated in Street Smart NJ in some way. The campaign uses outdoor, transit and online advertising, along with grassroots public awareness efforts and law enforcement to address pedestrian safety.

Evaluations of previous Street Smart NJ campaigns have shown positive results. There was a 28 percent reduction in pedestrians jaywalking or crossing against the signal and a 40 percent reduction in drivers failing to yield to crossing pedestrians or cyclists following campaigns the NJTPA managed in March 2016.

See also
Metropolitan planning organizations of New Jersey
New York Metropolitan Transportation Council
Regional Plan Association

References

External links

 Plan 2050
 Annual Work Program
 Transportation Improvement Program
 About MPOs 

Transportation in New Jersey
Transportation planning
Metropolitan planning organizations
State agencies of New Jersey
Companies based in Newark, New Jersey
New York metropolitan area